Andreas Lutz (born 1981 in Freiburg i. Br.) is a German Media artist. In his work, he analyzes phenomena of perception versus reality and the interaction of semiotics and sound with audio-visual installations.

Work
Lutz graduated from University of Applied Sciences Offenburg with a diploma in Media and Information engineering in 2009. His initial works refer to alternative human-machine interaction. For "Because clicking is so 90s"., a Natural user interface controllable only with gestures and voice, he received the Webby Award in 2010. In 2012, he founded the interdisciplinary studio KASUGA, which is active in the experimental field of design, interaction and sound and develops audio-visual installations, integrated interactions systems and contemporary media art pieces. The work of Andreas Lutz has been exhibited at The National Art Center, Tokyo, the Center for Art and Media Karlsruhe, the OpenArt Biennale in Örebro (Sweden) and won the Excellence Award at the 19th Japan Media Arts Festival, Japan and the  iF Design Award, Germany

References

External links
 Andreas Lutz website

German electronic musicians
German artists
Living people
1981 births